This is a list of Estonian television related events from 1957.

Events
 20 October – first advertisement in television. The advertisement lasted 2 minutes.

Debuts

Television shows

Ending this year

Births

Deaths

See also
 1957 in Estonia

References

1950s in Estonian television